Harry Sidebottom is a British author and historian, best known for his two series of historical novels the Warrior of Rome, and Throne of the Caesars.  He is Quondam Fellow and Tutor in Ancient History at St. Benet's Hall, Oxford, and lecturer at Lincoln College.

Early life
Sidebottom was born in Cambridge and brought up in Newmarket, Suffolk, where his father worked as a racehorse trainer.  He attended Fairstead House School, Newmarket, and The King's School, Ely.

Sidebottom read Ancient History for his first degree, at Lancaster University (1977–1980).  He was awarded an MPhil in 1982 from the University of Manchester and later a DPhil from the University of Oxford. He studied at Corpus Christi College, where he is a member of the senior common room. He has appeared as a presenter on the History Channel's Ancient Discoveries.

Books

Warrior of Rome
From the beginning Sidebottom intended the Warrior of Rome to be a series structured in trilogies. The first three volumes take place in the Middle East and subsequent arcs are set around the Black Sea, the Baltic, Sicily, North Africa, and Italy. Sidebottom stated he drew inspiration for the series from historical writer Tacitus and commented that he had based several of the series' elements on real people and events from history. The series has sold well, with Fire in the East selling over 100,000 copies and spending five weeks in the UK top 10 upon its release. Worldwide the series has sold over half a million copies.

The Last Hour is a thriller set in the City of Rome. It was shortlisted for the Historical Writers Association Gold Crown for the outstanding historical novel of 2018.

The Burning Road, a new novel featuring Ballista, was published on 30 September 2021. The series centres on the Anglo-Roman soldier Marcus Clodius Ballista (a fictionalized version of Balista, a.k.a. Callistus, one of the Thirty Tyrants) as he must live through and survive the machinations of the Roman Empire and several of the crises of the second half of the third century AD.

Throne of the Caesars
Sidebottom has written another series set in ancient Rome and its empire called Throne of the Caesars. The new trilogy is set 30 years before the first Warrior of Rome book in the reigns of Severus Alexander and Maximinus Thrax (AD 235–38) beginning with the assassination of Alexander and ending with the deaths of Pupienus and Balbinus.

Bibliography

Fiction

Warrior of Rome
Fire in the East (Michael Joseph, 2008)
King of Kings (Penguin, 2009) 
Lion of the Sun (Penguin, 2010)  
The Caspian Gates (Penguin, 2011)  
The Wolves of the North (Penguin, 2012)
The Amber Road (Penguin/Michael Joseph, 2013)
The Last Hour (Bonnier Zaffre, 2018) Shortlisted for The Historical Writers` Association Gold Crown for the outstanding historical novel of the year https://historicalwriters.org/hwa-crowns-2018-the-shortlists/
The Burning Road (Bonnier  Zaffre, 2021) A Book of the Year in The Times
Falling Sky (Zaffre, 2022)

Throne of the Caesars

Iron & Rust (HarperCollins, 2014)
Blood & Steel (HarperCollins, 2015)
Fire & Sword (HarperCollins, 2016)

Stand-alone novels
The Lost Ten (Bonnier Zaffre, 2019)
The Return (Bonnier Zaffre, 2020)

Non-fiction
Ancient Warfare: A Very Short Introduction, Oxford University Press (2004)  
International Relations, The Cambridge Companion of Greek and Roman Warfare (2007)
Blackwell Encyclopedia of Ancient Battles (ed. with Michael Whitby) (2017)
  The Mad Emperor: Heliogabalus and the Decadence of Rome, Oneworld (2022) A Book of the Year in The Spectator, BBC History Extra, and The Financial Times; shortlisted for The Slightly Foxed Best First Biography 2022 Prize

References

External links
Interview with Historvius.com
Ancient Warfare interview

Fellows of St Benet's Hall, Oxford
Living people
British historians
Writers of historical fiction set in antiquity
British historical novelists
21st-century male writers
Year of birth missing (living people)
People educated at King's Ely